Aleksandar Vasin (21 June 1933 – 2 April 2016) was a Yugoslav fencer. He competed in the individual sabre event at the 1960 Summer Olympics.

References

External links
 

1933 births
2016 deaths
Serbian male sabre fencers
Yugoslav male sabre fencers
Olympic fencers of Yugoslavia
Fencers at the 1960 Summer Olympics
Sportspeople from Belgrade